Ronald Powell (born 5 March 1968) is a Nevisian cricketer. He played in ten first-class and twenty-three List A matches for the Leeward Islands from 1994 to 2002.

See also
 List of Leeward Islands first-class cricketers

References

External links
 

1968 births
Living people
Nevisian cricketers
Leeward Islands cricketers